EDAS - Experimental Children's Architectural Studio (also known as EDAS-Kirpichev School-Studio) was founded in 1977 by the laureate of UNESCO prize Vladislav Kirpichev. EDAS is not a public educational institution. Classes are held by the author's method, assuming the maximum involvement of students in the creative process. The school children are doing at the age 2.5–16 years.

About the school
School-Studio EDAS (Experimental Children's Architectural Studio) - a non-governmental studio of additional education for children was founded in 1977 by Vladislav Kirpichev. And since then is the first and unique children's architectural Studio, both in Russia and in the world.

As described the history of EDAS formation Andrei Rodionov : "Kirpichev needed helpers to learn creative space available to him. He typed the command of children, believing in them, and they believed him. "And over time, school-studio has become a real "collective creative personality" with recognizable artistic techniques, special composite systems and formal common interests.

The classes are held by the original technique (art technique), with the maximum involvement of pupils in the creative process. In the process of learning Kirpichev immerses children in the atmosphere of modern plastic problems in which occurs the formation of the project and compositional thinking, the feeling of form, space, rhythm, texture, color.

Developing teaching methods, Vladislav Kirpichev found that the program must be dynamic and personalized, soft and non-violent. As a result, he formed the fundamental principles of the technique. In the Studio uses a unique language, suitable for expressing architectural fantasies. There is a constant mutual learning. Children not only follow the advice of the teacher, but also inspired by the works of the colleagues. 
School-Studio EDAS is not an educational institution in the conventional sense. Vladislav Kirpichev has repeatedly said that the existing system of education - child abuse. And the result achieved through hard work under strong pressure. When that is possible to teach otherwise is through self-education through motivation. In the studio school of Vladislav Kirpichev teachers are working on the development of creative abilities provoking the work of different kinds of thinking. Thereby, structuring the research development opportunities creativity is without limiting its professional purposes. EDAS founder sees the learning objectives in this.

Kirpichev does not conduct competitions and selections of the students. He believes that "all the children are geniuses" and states that any child is able to develop his abilities.

International recognition

Due to the fact that the work of Vladislav Kirpichev widely known world over, EDAS constantly participates in various international events.

Exhibitions, lectures and master classes of School -studio EDAS are regularly held in Russia, Europe and USA:
- DAM (German Architecture Museum) - Frankfurt am Main, Germany, 1989 
- Pacific Design Center (Los Angeles) and the Whitney Museum (New York) during the show Steelcase Design Partnership "Mondo Materialis", 1990 
- Manezh Central Exhibition Hall, Moscow, 1990 
- Documenta Archive Kassel - Kassel, Germany, 1991 
- Central House of Artists (CHA) on the Crimean Val, Moscow, 1993 
- NAi (National Architectural Center) - Rotterdam, 1995 
- Akademie der Künste and AEDES, Berlin 
- ICP (Institute of Cultural Policy) Hamburg 2006

In 2001, together with the Serpentine Gallery in Hyde Park in London was an action "100 children - 100 meters." And in 2008, during the international festival The Darmstadt Summer of Architecture, installation EDAS "10,000 lights» gathered at the opening more than 10 thousand of people.

Vladislav Kirpichev has twice participated in the events of the Aspen Institute (http://www.aspeninstitute.org/): in 2004 - in the work of the International Design Conference (idca:54) and in 2005 - in the work of the Aspen Ideas Festival (http://www.aspenideas.org/). July 9, 2005, US President Bill Clinton personally welcomed Vladislav Kirpichev in Aspen. For many years the collection of children’s works EDAS is located in the directory Smithsonian Institution in Washington (USA). The life and creative activity of EDAS widely covered in Russian and foreign press. Today, there are over 500 publications about the Studio in Russian and foreign media.

About the Fund
In August 2013 in Moscow was registered EDAS Fund (Foundation for the Support and Development of School-studio of Vladislav Kirpichev EDAS).

About Vladislav Kirpichev

The head of Studio of the architect Vladislav Kirpichev is a laureate of UNESCO prize (a project of the Center of Creative Activity), a Professor. 
In different years he taught at FH Frankfurt on Main, the Bartlett School of Architecture (UCL) and Greenwich University School of Architecture. Guest-Professor Staedelschule in Frankfurt, Aarhus School of Architecture, d'angevandte Wien.

Vladislav Kirpichev was born in Ural, in 1948. Graduated from Moscow architectural Institute in 1975. Simultaneously he studied classical ballet in choreographic Studio of the Bolshoi theatre. In 1972 he has won the competition of the International Union of architects and received the prize of UNESCO. Till 1977 worked as an architect in Mosproject-1. In 1977 has organized the private Studio (the First Studio), which soon became known as the EDAS - Experimental Children's Architectural Studio.

In 1993 he became a laureate of the State prize of the Russian Federation "For works of School-Studio EDAS as the implementation of a unique author's direction in design.".

From 1994 to 2004 Vladislav Kirpichev taught architecture at universities in Germany, England, Denmark, and Austria.
Thanks to Vladislav Kirpichev, Moscow was visited with the lectures by many world famous architects: Zaha Hadid (Zaha Hadid Architects), Benedetta Tagliabue (Benedetta Tagliabue, Miralles-Tagliabue Architects), Stephen Holl (Steven Holl Architects), Sir Peter Cook (Sir Peter Cook), Maine (Thom Mayne, Morphosis), Wolf Prix (Wolf Prix, Coop Himmelblau), Greg Lynn (Greg Lynn Form), Klaus Bollinger and Manfred Grohmann (Bollinger + Grohmann), Ian Ritchie, Eric Oven Moss, Christian Müller, Jesse Reiser (Reiser + Umemoto), Kas Oosterhuis and Ilona Lenard, Enrique Norten (TEN Arquitectos).

Today, there are over 500 publications about EDAS in Russian and foreign media.

References

 New York Times. A Funny Thing Happened to Soviet Architecture Photo of Ascencion to the Peak, Glass Monument for 2001 
 Books.Google. EDAS – Design Kommunalka 
 stereopresence. Child’s play the Australian 
 The Bartlett School of Architecture 
 ARCHITECTURE. LIUDMILA KIRPICHEV, VLADISLAV KIRPICHEV - PAPER ARCHITECTURE IN THE SOVIET UNION. PROTAGONISTS, TEACHERS AND STUDENTS LOOKING BACK AT THE 1980’S 
 LES-Gallery. Nikita Sologubovsky and Sergey Nadtochy “Parts of the first irrational thoughts with some meaning…” 
 wiley. Back to School: Architectural Education - the Information and the Argument 
 Cultural Convergence behind the Iron Curtain: Architectural Ideas and Parallels 
 AD. Back to School 
 Archxchange 
 The University of Waikato 
 Eventot 
 DBZ-online. Moskau Berlin 2006 
 La Biennale che ha lasciato il segno 

Schools in Moscow
Educational institutions established in 1977